Westcott Stock Farm, also known as Westcott Place Farm, is a historic home and farm located at Centerville, Wayne County, Indiana. The farmhouse was built between 1890 and 1895, and is a large two-story, Queen Anne style brick dwelling. It sits on a brick foundation and features a semi-octagonal bay. Also on the property are the contributing laundry house / tool shed, garage, carriage house, horse barn, bank barn, a small calving shed, and a cistern with a hand-operated pump.

It was added to the National Register of Historic Places in 1998.

References

Farms on the National Register of Historic Places in Indiana
Queen Anne architecture in Indiana
Houses completed in 1895
Buildings and structures in Wayne County, Indiana
National Register of Historic Places in Wayne County, Indiana